Chincha Alta District is one of eleven districts of the province Chincha in Peru.

One of its iconic sites is the Manor House known as Hacienda San José.

Mayor: Armando Huamán Tasayco (2019-2022)

See also 
 Administrative divisions of Peru

References

1857 establishments in Peru